Gwanhun-dong is a dong, neighbourhood of Jongno-gu in Seoul, South Korea. It is a legal dong (beopjeong-dong ) governed under its administrative dong (haengjeong-dong ), Jongno 1, 2, 3, 4 ga-dong.

The area is bordered by Anguk-dong and Songhyeon-dong to the north, Gyeongun-dong to the east, and Insadong  to the south, and Gyeonji-dong to the west. During the early period of the Joseon Dynasty (1392–1897), the place belonged to Gwanin-bang (寬仁坊) - bang (坊) was an administrative unit during the time - of the Jungbu district (中部), Hanseong (old name for the capital, Seoul).

See also 
Insadong
Administrative divisions of South Korea

References

External links
 Jongno-gu Official site in English
 Jongno-gu Official site
 Status quo of Jongno-gu by administrative dong 
 Jongno 1, 2, 3, 4 ga-dong The Residential office 
 The origin of Gwanhun-dong's name

Neighbourhoods of Jongno-gu